Mishaal bin Majid Al Saud (born 1957) has been governor of Jeddah since 1997 and a member of House of Saud.

Early life and education
Mishaal bin Majid was born in Riyadh in 1957. His family moved to Jeddah in 1971. His father is Majid bin Abdulaziz, a son of King Abdulaziz and a full-brother of Prince Sattam. The mother of Prince Mishaal is Nouf bint Abdallah Al Fahd Al Muhanna.

Prince Mishaal is full brother of Prince Abdulaziz and has also five sisters. One of his sisters, Jawaher bint Majid, is the first Saudi woman to have been granted the title of the patron of arts in Saudi Arabia. Another, Basma bint Majid, married Bandar bin Faisal, one of King Faisal's sons.

Mishaal bin Majid was educated entirely in Saudi Arabia and is a graduate of King Saud University with a degree in business and public administration.

Career
Prior to becoming Jeddah governor in 1998, Mishaal bin Majid is reported to have spent 16 years in the private sector. He replaced Nazir bin Hasan Naseef in the post. 

The Jeddah governor, a position less than the governor of a province but more than the governor of a typical town, works as a separate department under the Makkah Region governor and in close association with the ministry of interior. Frequently seen publicly around Jeddah attending openings, ceremonies and weddings, Prince Mishaal appears approachable and engaged.

Okaz's comments praising Mishaal bin Majid for preserving traditional values and culture were notable given that he is the governor of the Kingdom's most liberal city, Jeddah, and sent a message that King Abdullah still placed a significance on continuity, stability, and control, even as he pursued incremental reforms.

Other positions
Mishaal bin Majid has been a member of the Allegiance Council since 2007. He is president of the governing council of the Assembly and President of the Social Development Forum that attempts to address the role of voluntary social work and the implementation of initiatives aimed at promoting social development to attain a consolidated society in which individuals who have attained better living standards want to help others achieve the same goal and to establish the concept of individual empowerment through each person discovering their own capabilities and fulfilling their potential without reliance on others. The forum is organized every two years by the Society of Majid bin Abdulaziz for Development and Social Services, a non-profit social work organization, which in 2010 was honored by being named the leading non-profit organization in sustainable development. This award was presented during the 27th session of the Council of Ministers of Social Affairs in the Gulf Cooperation Council (GCC). He is also the board chairman of the Society of Majid bin Abdulaziz for Development and Social Services.

On 15 April 2021 Prince Mishaal was named by King Salman as one of his advisors at the rank of minister.

Views
King Abdullah began to curtail some privileges offered to Saudi royal family members, including cellphone service for "thousands of princes and princesses", year-round government-paid hotel suites in Jeddah and the right of royals to request unlimited free tickets from the state airline. Some of them were angered by these rules. Mishal bin Majid had taken to driving between Jeddah and Riyadh "to show his annoyance" at the reforms.

Personal life
Prince Mishaal is married to Al Jawhara bint Khalid bin Musaid Al Saud, and has four children: Muhdi, Mishail, Nuf and Khalid. He speaks fluent English more characteristic of a Saudi who has spent years in the U.S. He has traveled frequently to Florida and California as a tourist.

References

Mishaal
Mishaal
Mishaal
Mishaal
1957 births
Mishaal
Mishaal
Mishaal
Living people
Mishaal
Mayors of places in Saudi Arabia